Jacinta Parsons is a radio broadcaster and writer from Melbourne, Australia who has worked at both community radio station Triple R and for both Double J and ABC Radio Melbourne.

Radio 

Parsons began broadcasting at community radio station Triple R in 2006 on the Australian music show, Local and/or General, celebrating emerging local musicians. During her time at Triple R she also hosted Dynamite, Detour and Breakfasters.

In 2015, Parsons moved to the ABC and joined the Double J team as the Music Director for ABC Local Radio.

In December 2017, ABC announced that Parsons and Sami Shah host the Breakfast program on ABC Radio Melbourne from January 2018 replacing Red Symons. The remained in the role until December 2019 before moving to other positions.

In January 2020, Parsons replaced Richelle Hunt as host of ABC Radio Melbourne's Afternoon program and co-host of the Friday Revue with Brian Nankervis.

Writing 
Parsons released a memoir in September 2020, entitled Unseen. It explores living with Crohn's Disease and chronic illness for over 20 years.

Life 
Parsons was diagnosed with Crohn's disease in 1997 and is an advocate for other people with the disease with Crohn's and Colitis Australia

Parsons is an active member of the music and arts community and is a board member for Rollercoaster Theatre - a not-for-profit ensemble of trained actors with intellectual disabilities from a wide range of backgrounds.

She lives in Melbourne with her two children.

References 

Year of birth missing (living people)
Living people
Australian radio presenters
Australian women radio presenters
People educated at Blackburn High School
Australian memoirists
21st-century Australian women writers
21st-century Australian writers
People with Crohn's disease
Writers from Melbourne